The 2019–20 World Rugby Women's Sevens Series was the eighth edition of the global circuit for women's national rugby sevens teams, organised by World Rugby.

Only five of the originally scheduled eight tournaments were completed before the series was cut short due to the coronavirus pandemic. New Zealand was awarded the series title at the end of June 2020, leading by 16 points over second-placed Australia. 

The events planned for Hong Kong, Langford and Paris were postponed, before eventually being cancelled.

Format
Twelve nations competed at each event, drawn into three pools of four teams. The top-placed teams after the pool matches at each tournament played off for a Cup, with gold, silver and bronze medals also awarded to the first three teams. The winner of the series was determined by the overall points standings gained across all events in the season.

Teams
The eleven "core teams" qualified to participate in all series events for 2019–20 were:

 
 
 
 
 
 

 
 
 
 
 

Brazil was promoted to core team status after winning the World Series qualifier held in Hong Kong in 2019, replacing China who were relegated after finishing as the lowest-placed core team in 2018–19.

Tour venues
The original itinerary for the 2019–20 women's circuit included three new legs to be played in Cape Town, Hamilton and Hong Kong, although only the first two were able to be played. The women's Tokyo Sevens was not included in the series due to the Olympic Sevens being scheduled there instead.

After all tournaments planned for the second quarter of 2020 were cancelled, the series was reduced from eight legs to five. All but one of the completed legs were combined sevens  tournaments with their corresponding events from the men's World Series, with only the Glendale tournament hosted as a stand-alone women's event.

The tournaments planned for Hong Kong (3–5 April 2020), Langford (2–3 May 2020) and Paris (30–31 May 2020), were ultimately cancelled due to health concerns related to the COVID-19 pandemic.

Standings

Official standings for the 2019–20 series:

Source: World Rugby

{| class="wikitable" style="font-size:92%;"
|-
!colspan=2| Legend 
|-
| No colour
|Core team in 2019–20 and re-qualified as a core team for the next World Rugby Women's Sevens Series 
|-
|style="background:#ffc;"|Yellow
|Invitational team
|}

Placings summary 
Tallies of top four tournament placings during the 2019–20 series, by team:

Tournaments

Glendale

Dubai*

Cape Town*

* 5th Place and Challenge Trophy not contested

Players

Tries scored

Points scored

Updated: 4 February 2020

Awards

Updated: 4 February 2020

See also
 2019–20 World Rugby Sevens Series (for men) 
 Rugby sevens at the 2020 Summer Olympics

References
Notes

Citations

Sources

 
2019
2019 rugby sevens competitions
2020 rugby sevens competitions
2019 in women's rugby union
2020 in women's rugby union
World Rugby Women's Sevens Series